Cyperus tabina is a species of sedge that is native to parts of South America.

See also 
 List of Cyperus species

References 

tabina
Plants described in 1868
Flora of Argentina
Flora of Bolivia
Flora of Brazil
Flora of Colombia
Flora of Costa Rica
Flora of Ecuador
Flora of Panama
Flora of Peru
Flora of Paraguay
Taxa named by Ernst Gottlieb von Steudel